The Oak Ridges Moraine lies in Southern Ontario, Canada. It contains the headwaters of sixty-five rivers and streams.  It has a wide diversity of woodlands, wetlands, watercourses, kettle lakes, kettle bogs, and significant flora and fauna. It is one of the few remaining continuous green corridors in southern Ontario: it remains thirty percent forested and is one of the last refuges for forest birds in all of southern Ontario.

The moraine provides habitat for a wide variety of plant and animal species, over seventy of which are threatened or endangered in Canada, including the West Virginia white butterfly, Jefferson salamander, red-shouldered hawk, and American ginseng. The moraine's rare wetlands support plants and insects more typical of northern Ontario.  The remnants of tallgrass prairie and oak-pine savanna in the eastern portion are globally threatened ecosystems.

Happy Valley Forests

Happy Valley Forests is a 648-hectare upland forest with wooded swamps and minor wetland areas. It supports a diverse wildlife population, including over 100 species of birds, some of which are endangered or threatened in Canada. The forests are characterized by the dominant sugar maple in most areas, and red maple on its eastern edges. It is a provincial ANSI Life Science ecological zone.

Provincially significant ecological areas
A number of provincially significant ecological areas are located in the Oak Ridges Moraine, among them forty-eight wetlands, and twenty-eight earth and life science Areas of Natural and Scientific Interest (ANSI-ES and ANSI-LS).

The table below lists the ecological zones by municipal jurisdiction; for zones that overlap multiple jurisdictions, the zone is listed in the jurisdiction which contains the greatest portion of that zone. Moreover, some of the zones listed may only have some portion of their complex on the Oak Ridges Moraine; for example, a small southern component of the Ansnorveldt Wetland Complex lies on the northern edge of the Oak Ridges Moraine.

References
 
 
 
 
 
  
  
 
 
 
 
  
  
  
 
 
 
 
 
 
 
 
  
 
 
 
 
  
 
   More precise measurements were found in  
 
 
  
 
 
  
 
 
 
 
  
 
 
  
 
 
 
  
  
  
  
  
 
  
  

Oak Ridges Moraine